WebSphere Application Server Community Edition (WASCE) was a free-of-charge, certified Java EE 6 application server for building and managing Java applications. Until September 30, 2016, it was IBM's supported distribution of Apache Geronimo that usee Tomcat for servlet container and Axis 2 for web services. Another difference from Apache Geronimo is that WASCE came with Db2 and Informix database drivers, better XML parser libraries (XML4J and XLXP) and contained the latest patches from unreleased upstream versions.
Over 30 WASCE developers were committers in the Apache Geronimo project.

Product Features 
 Java EE 6 programming model.
 Eclipse plug-in for developers.
 Embedded Apache Derby database. External database support for IBM Db2, Informix, Oracle, Microsoft SQL Server, PostgreSQL and MySQL.
 "Customizable application server software that features a small footprint, making it easier to download and manage", saving on system resources and improving performance by allowing you to dynamically enable GBean-based components.
 Centralized user management to support systems administration and deployed applications based on Java Authorization Contract for Containers (JACC) and Lightweight Directory Access Protocol (LDAP) authentication.

End of Support
IBM announced that September 20, 2013, WASCE will be withdrawn from marketing and support will be withdrawn September 30, 2016.

See also 
 Apache Geronimo
 JBoss application server
 IBM WebSphere Application Server
 Comparison of application servers
 GlassFish

External links 
Home | Free download | System Requirements | Support
User Guide
Apache Geronimo tutorials
Essentials of WebSphere Application Server Community Edition.
WASCE community forum and Apache Geronimo forum
join Apache Geronimo community
WebSphere Application Server Community Edition developersWorks space
Kick-start your application development (free package for J2EE development)
Geronimo resources area at IBM developerWorks
WebSphere Application Server Community Edition resources area at IBM developerWorks
Migrating from Tomcat Version 6.0 to WebSphere Application Server Community Edition V2.1

Product news 
What's new in WebSphere Application Server Community Edition V2.0
IBM WebSphere Application Server Community Edition V2.1, built on the Apache Geronimo project, offers a fast and inexpensive way to develop and deploy Java EE 5 applications
What’s new in WebSphere Application Server Community Edition V2.1
Software withdrawal and support discontinuance: IBM WebSphere Application Server Community Editions V2.1 and V3.0 and Entry Support for Apache Geronimo

Notes 

Java enterprise platform
Web frameworks
Web server software
Application Server Community Edition
Proprietary software